Interior Alaska is the central region of Alaska's territory, roughly bounded by the Alaska Range to the south and the Brooks Range to the north. It is largely wilderness. Mountains include Denali in the Alaska Range, the Wrangell Mountains, and the Ray Mountains. The native people of the interior are Alaskan Athabaskans. The largest city in the interior is Fairbanks, Alaska's second-largest city, in the Tanana Valley. Other towns include North Pole, just southeast of Fairbanks, Eagle, Tok, Glennallen, Delta Junction, Nenana, Anderson, Healy and Cantwell. The interior region has an estimated population of 113,154.



Climate 

Interior Alaska experiences extreme seasonal temperature variability. Winter temperatures in Fairbanks average −12 °F (−24 °C) and summer temperatures average +62 °F (+17 °C). Temperatures there have been recorded as low as −65 °F (−54 °C) in mid-winter, and as high as +99 °F (+37 °C) in summer. Both the highest and lowest temperature records for the state were set in the Interior, with 100 °F (38 °C) in Fort Yukon and −80 °F (−62 °C) in Prospect Creek. Temperatures within a given winter are highly variable as well; extended cold snaps of forty below zero can be followed by unseasonable warmth with temperatures above freezing due to chinook wind effects.

Summers can be as wet for extended periods creating ideal fire weather conditions. Weak thunderstorms produce mostly dry lightning, sparking wildfires that are mostly left to burn themselves out as they are often far from populated areas. The 2004 season set a new record with over  burned.

The average annual precipitation in Fairbanks is 11.3 inches (28.7 cm).  Most of this comes in the form of snow during the winter.  Most storms in the interior of Alaska originate in the Gulf of Alaska, south of the state, though these storms often have limited precipitation due to a rain shadow effect caused by the Alaska Range.

On clear winter nights, the aurora borealis can often be seen dancing in the sky.  Like all subarctic regions, the months from May to July in the summer have no night, only a twilight during the night hours. The months of November to January have little daylight.  Fairbanks receives an average 21 hours of daylight between May 10 and August 2 each summer, and an average of less than four hours of daylight between November 18 and January 24 each winter.

The interior of Alaska is largely underlined by discontinuous permafrost, which grades to continuous permafrost as the Arctic Circle is approached.

Alaska Natives 
While the vast majority of indigenous Native people of Interior Alaska are Athabaskan Indians, large Yup'ik and Iñupiaq populations reside in Fairbanks.

The federally recognized tribes of Interior Alaska: 
 Council of Athabascan Tribal Governments (CATG): Beaver Village, Birch Creek Tribe, Circle Native Community, Native Village of Fort Yukon, Native Village of Venetie Tribal Government (also known as Arctic Village and Village of Venetie).
 Tanana Chiefs Conference (TCC): Allakaket Village, Alatna Village, Village of Anaktuvuk Pass, Chalkyitsik Village, Village of Dot Lake, Native Village of Eagle, Evansville Village (also known as Bettles Field), Galena Village (also known as Louden Village), Healy Lake Village, Hughes Village, Huslia Village, Village of Kaltag, Koyukuk Native Village, Manley Hot Springs Village, Native Village of Minto, Nenana Native Association, Nikolai Village (Edzeno’ Native Council), Northway Village, Nulato Village, Rampart Village, Native Village of Ruby, Native Village of Stevens, Native Village of Tanacross, Telida Village, Native Village of Tetlin.
 Tanana Tribal Council: Native Village of Tanana.
 Other places in the Interior Service Area not Federally Recognized as Tribes: Alcan, Anderson, Big Delta, Canyon Village, Central, Chatanika, Chicken, Clear, Delta Junction, Fairbanks, Fox, Indian River, Kokrines, Lake Minchumina, Medfra, North Pole, Salcha, Tok, Toklat, Tolovana, Wiseman, Wood River.

References 

Regions of Alaska
Tourism regions of Alaska
Alaskan Athabaskans